Stillwell is an unincorporated community in Pleasant Township, LaPorte County, Indiana.

History
A post office was established at Stillwell in 1870, and remained in operation until it was discontinued in 1963. The community was named for Thomas Stillwell, a pioneer settler.

Geography

References

Unincorporated communities in LaPorte County, Indiana
Unincorporated communities in Indiana